Eden Court Theatre (Scottish Gaelic: Cùirt an Easbaig) is a large theatre, cinema and arts venue situated in Inverness, Scotland close to the banks of the River Ness. The theatre has recently undergone a complete refurbishment and major extension, adding a second theatre, two dedicated cinema screens, two performance/dance studios, improved dressing room and green room facilities and additional office space.  The theatre's restaurant and bar facilities have also been totally overhauled and improved.

History
Plans for a theatre, restaurant and dance-hall were put first forward in November 1967, then lengthy negotiations followed. The Eden Court Theatre was formally opened on 15 April 1976 by Andrew Cruickshank MBE, an actor best known for his portrayal of Dr Cameron in BBC's long-running series "Dr Finlay's Casebook". It was built on a site next to the Ness river and incorporated the gothic Bishop's Palace residence (from which it took its name) into a new building designed by architects Law Dunbar and Naismith.  The theatre was at that time a revolution to Inverness, and the wider Highland Region.  It provided modern theatre performance space for the first time since the early '30s.  Inverness had previously had a number of theatres including the Theatre Royal, previously situated on Bank street which burnt down in 1934  and the Empire Theatre on Academy Street. This theatre had originally opened as The Central Hall Picture House in 1912, but after the Theatre Royal burnt down, it was converted to a fully functioning theatre and reopened as the Empire around 1934.  The building was designed by A. Ross & Son and was eventually demolished in 1971.  Many famous names performed at this popular venue - Harry Lauder, Renee Houston and Calum Kennedy The Corries, Alastair Gillies, to name a few.  Today the modern Penta Hotel  building stands in its place.  A theatre originally built as an Opera House, with full stage facilities, by the name of The Playhouse also existed in Inverness situated on Academy Street, in the  town centre. It was built by Alexander B King the cinema magnate, and it was one of the flagship cinemas of Caledonian Associated Cinemas Ltd (CAC) who operated out of Inverness.  The Playhouse staged occasional shows but was principally a cinema seating 1429, and had a proscenium opening of 45 feet, but  the only opera ever presented there was by the local Amateur Operatic Society after the Empire Theatre was demolished. The building also hosted the Gaelic Mod with live performances being transmitted by BBC Scotland on Television.  Andy Stewart used to put on his show there, as well as at other CAC venues all over Scotland including the Lyceum at Dumfries, and the Playhouse in Perth. The Playhouse was set on fire by an arsonist in 1972 and was later demolished to make way for the new Eastgate Shopping Development.

Present day
Eden Court reopened in November 2007, having undergone a complete refurbishment and extension by Robertson Construction and Page\Park Architects.  Upon its reopening it became the largest combined arts centre in Scotland. With the reconstruction complete the theatre now has two auditoriums, the main auditorium, renamed the Empire Theatre has a capacity of just under 840.  The second auditorium, named the One Touch Theatre has a capacity of approximately 270.  The two new cinemas, La Scala and The Playhouse, have capacities of 125 and 78 respectively.

The Empire Theatre, La Scala and Playhouse are named after the former venues of those names (the first La Scala was a cinema in Strother's Lane which closed down in the 1990s). The One Touch Theatre is named after the OneTouch Ultra diabetes monitor, produced by local employer LifeScan. La Scala and Playhouse host the annual Inverness Film Festival which includes many Scottish Premieres and niche and foreign language films.

The refurbished theatre also includes the Jim Love Studio, named after the late Inverness Courier editor.

Awards
The theatre has won an award from the Royal Institution of Chartered Surveyors (RICS).  It won the Community Benefit prize at the 2008 awards.

It won the 2009 "Specialist Carpentry Refurbishment Award" for the high standard of carpentry work carried out in the Bishops Palace as undertaken by specialist contractor Ryvoan Developments.

See also
List of Category A listed buildings in Highland
List of post-war Category A listed buildings in Scotland

References

External links
 

Culture in Inverness
Buildings and structures in Inverness
Theatres in Scotland
Category A listed buildings in Highland (council area)
Listed theatres in Scotland
Theatres completed in 1976
1976 establishments in Scotland
Arts organisations based in Scotland